Adam Brooks Reed (born January 8, 1970) is an American voice actor, animator, screenwriter, television producer and television director. Reed created, writes, and voice acts the FX adult animated comedy series Archer, which premiered in September 2009. He also voice acted, wrote, directed and produced the television series Sealab 2021 and Frisky Dingo, with his co-creator and creative partner Matt Thompson.

Early work
Reed graduated from the University of North Carolina at Chapel Hill in 1992 with a degree in English. Reed and longtime collaborator Matt Thompson started out at Cartoon Network doing various odd jobs as production assistants, until they came up with their own show, High Noon Toons, in 1994. High Noon Toons was a 3-hour programming block of cartoons hosted by cowboy hand puppets Haas and Lil' Jo (a Bonanza pun). Thompson and Reed were frequently drunk during filming. Once in 1995, the duo was reprimanded for lighting one of the prop sets on fire.

After leaving Cartoon Network in 1996 (over disagreements while working on a morning cartoon show hosted by Carrot Top), Reed and Thompson moved to New York, where they would spend a year working in the "sordid underbelly" of daytime talk shows.

Companies
Reed and Thompson formed 70/30 Productions when they created Sealab 2021, one of the first original series for Adult Swim. The company's name came from the plan that Reed would do 70% of the writing and 30% of the producing, with Thompson doing the reverse.

The pair became known for their work on a number of other Adult Swim projects, including Frisky Dingo, which aired for several years after Sealab 2021 was cancelled.

In 2009, Reed and Thompson closed 70/30 Productions and formed Floyd County Productions to produce Reed's new project, the FX Network series Archer. The company not only develops exclusive programming but also creates content for other media, including the television shows Atlanta, Legion, Fargo, Goliath and It’s Always Sunny in Philadelphia.

Archer
After the cancellation of Frisky Dingo in 2008, Reed took a vacation to Spain to brainstorm ideas for a new project. His experience traversing the Vía de la Plata, and people-watching in Plaza Mayor in nearby Salamanca, enabled him to conceptualize his vision of Archer. Reed recalled in an interview:

Nevertheless, he believed developing a sitcom with the theme of global espionage was inevitable given his proclivity for adventure-driven comedy. Archer was originally pitched under the working title Duchess.

Archer draws inspiration from a variety of sources, including the James Bond franchise, OSS 117: Cairo, Nest of Spies (2006), and The Pink Panther franchise. The show's hallmarks include reference-heavy humor, rapid-fire dialogue, and meta-comedy. Archer is produced using limited animation and takes its visual style from mid-century comic art. The cast members record their lines individually, and the show regularly employs guest actors and actresses for supporting characters. There have been 127 episodes broadcast in the show's history.

Archer has received positive reviews from critics and won awards, including three Primetime Emmy Awards and four Critics Choice Awards. The series has also received 15 Annie Award nominations, among others, for outstanding achievement in animation, writing, direction, and voice acting.

Filmography

Television

Awards and honors

References

External links
 
 https://www.floydcountyproductions.tv/

American animated film directors
American animated film producers
Living people
Animators from North Carolina
American male voice actors
Writers from Asheville, North Carolina
Showrunners
American television producers
1970 births
Artists from Asheville, North Carolina
American male television writers